The San Esteban National Park (in Spanish Parque Nacional San Esteban) is located in Carabobo, Venezuela.

The park lies on the Northeastern part of Carabobo and it links with the Henri Pittier National Park of Aragua.

Both are natural reservation areas. The park was created in 1987 and it is 445 square kilometres. It lies in the municipalities of Guacara, Naguanagua, Puerto Cabello and San Diego.

Attractions
The park includes Solano Castle at Puerto Cabello. It also protects other historical areas including the Parque Arqueológico Piedra Pintada located in the area of Tronconero, Vigirima, where are petroglyphs made by pre-Colonial Indians, as well as The Way of the Spanish, a path between Puerto Cabello and Valencia, and its arched bridge; the town of San Esteban, home of national hero Bartolomé Salom, and the Indian Salt Way between Patanemo and Guacara.

Historical places 
 Castle of Solano
 Village of San Esteban
 Ecomuseum Villa Vincencio
 The house of General Bartolomé Salom
 The old colonial road or 'Road of the Spaniards' that used to link Valencia with Puerto Cabello 
 The bridge of Paso Hondo on the San Esteban river
 The Indian Road of the Salt between Patanemo and Guacara
 The Hacienda Quinta Pimentel
 The thermal baths and spa centre of Las Trincheras
 Petroglyphs of Vigirima, also known as Tronconero's Painted Stone

Some of the animals that can be found in the San Esteban National Park

External links 
 Information about the park  at the site of the Instituto Nacional de Parques (in Spanish)

National parks of Venezuela
Protected areas established in 1987
Geography of Carabobo
1987 establishments in Venezuela
Tourist attractions in Carabobo